Colin van Gool (born 10 February 1995 in the Netherlands) is a Dutch footballer who now plays for FC Eindhoven AV.

Career

Van Gool started his senior career with Helmond Sport in the Dutch Eerste Divisie, where he made three appearances and scored zero goals. After that, he played for VVV-Venlo, Canterbury United, Christchurch United, RKSV Nuenen, and FC Eindhoven AV, where he now plays.

References

External links 
 
 
 VoetbalNederland Profile
 

1995 births
Dutch footballers
Association football midfielders
Living people
FC Eindhoven players
Helmond Sport players
VVV-Venlo players
Canterbury United players
Christchurch United players
RKSV Nuenen players